Thierre De Mey (born 28 February 1956 in Brussels) is a musician and filmmaker from Belgium.

Biography
After studying film at the Institut des Arts de Diffusion, he continued to studying music composition and contemporary dance after meeting Fernand Schirren, for whose works he has written original incidental music. He works primarily with Rosas & Anne Teresa De Keersmaeker, Wim Vandekeybus and Michèle Anne De Mey, his youngest sister.

In 1993 he joined a class at IRCAM, where he developed his interest in electronic music. He was composer in residence at the Conservatory of Strasbourg and the Musica Festival in 2001 and 2002.

Since 2005 he has been one of four new directors of Charleroi / Danses, coordinating the multidisciplinary activities of the center choreography.

Main compositions
 1983: Rosas danst Rosas, ballet music for Anne Teresa De Keersmaeker's Rosas Company
 1985: Musique de tables, for three percussionists (for Wim Vandekeybus' Ultima Vez group)
 1990: Undo, monody for piano
 1991: Chaîne, for 2 pianos
 1991: Ice, duet for violin and violoncello (for Ultima Vez)
 1991: Movement No.3 for string quartet
 1991: String Quartet No.1
 1993: Kinok (for Rosas Company)
 1993: Passacaglia and variations for violin
 1994: Amor constante más allá de la muerte (for Rosas Company)
 1995: Concerto for violin and ensemble
 1995: Unknowness, for percussionists and sampled sounds
 1996: Tippeke (for Rosas Company)
 2002: Palindrome, hoket in 8
 2002: Water, for 6 percussionists, violoncello, electronic and sampled sounds
 2003: Élastique, electronic composition
 2004: Landscape 1, electronic composition

Main films
 1984: Floréal (documentary)
 1993: Love Sonnets, with Michèle Anne De Mey
 1996: Rosas danst Rosas, with Anne Teresa De Keersmaeker and Rosas Company
 1996: Tippeke, with Anne Teresa De Keersmaeker
 1998: 21 études à danser, with Michèle Anne De Mey
 1998: Musique de tables, with Wim Vandekeybus' group
 1999: Barbes Bleues
 2000: Dom Svobode, with Iztok Kovac
 2001: Ma mère l'Oye, with Anne Teresa De Keersmaeker, Michèle Anne De Mey, Sidi Larbi Cherkaoui and others.
 2002: Fase, with Anne Teresa De Keersmaeker and Michèle Anne De Mey
 2004: Counter Phrases, group of ten filmed choreographies, with Anne Teresa De Keersmaeker and Rosas Company.

See also

 List of Belgian film directors
 Cinema of Belgium

External links
 
 Interview with Thierry De Mey (2001)
 
 

1945 births
Living people
20th-century composers
21st-century composers
20th-century Belgian male musicians
21st-century Belgian male musicians
Belgian composers
Belgian film directors
Male composers
Musicians from Brussels